Norge is a town in Grady County, Oklahoma, United States. The population was 145 at the 2010 census, up from 82 in 2000.

Geography
Norge is located in western Grady County at  (34.988552, -97.996090).

The name Norge is the Norwegian word for Norway.

Demographics

As of the census of 2000, there were 82 people, 29 households, and 24 families living in the town. There were 33 housing units at an average density of 332.6 per square mile (127.4/km2). The racial makeup of the town was 87.80% White, 6.10% Native American, 3.66% from other races, and 2.44% from two or more races. Hispanic or Latino of any race were 3.66% of the population.

There were 29 households, out of which 44.8% had children under the age of 18 living with them, 69.0% were married couples living together, 13.8% had a female householder with no husband present, and 13.8% were non-families. 13.8% of all households were made up of individuals, and 10.3% had someone living alone who was 65 years of age or older. The average household size was 2.83 and the average family size was 3.08.

In the town, the population was spread out, with 31.7% under the age of 18, 9.8% from 18 to 24, 32.9% from 25 to 44, 13.4% from 45 to 64, and 12.2% who were 65 years of age or older. The median age was 34 years. For every 100 females, there were 95.2 males. For every 100 females age 18 and over, there were 100.0 males.

The median income for a household in the town was $48,750, and the median income for a family was $48,750. Males had a median income of $30,833 versus $24,375 for females. The per capita income for the town was $15,000. There were 7.7% of families and 8.0% of the population living below the poverty line, including 11.1% of under eighteens and none of those over 64.

References

Towns in Grady County, Oklahoma
Towns in Oklahoma